Watch on the Rhine may refer to:

 Die Wacht am Rhein, a German poem from 1841 and a song from 1854
 Watch on the Rhine (1926 film), German film
 Watch on the Rhine (play), (1941) a play by Lillian Hellman
 Watch on the Rhine, (1943) a film based on Lillian Hellman's play 
 "Watch on the Rhine" (German: Unternehmen: Wacht am Rhein), the German ground offensive in late 1944 on the Western Front that set off the Battle of the Bulge
 Watch on the Rhine (novel) (2007), a science fiction novel by Tom Kratman and John Ringo 
 Wacht am Rhein, an alternative name for the Niederwalddenkmal monument in Rüdesheim am Rhein